Nikola Jovanović (born 12 June 1992) is a Serbian football defender.

Club career
Born in Priština, Jovanović started his career with Javor Ivanjica in the 2010–11 season. Later, he spent mostly time with Rudar Kostolac and Železničar Lajkovac in the Serbian League West, where he appeared as a loaned player until the end of 2014–15 season. In summer 2015, Jovanović joined the Serbian First League side Inđija, but after a half-season he moved to Loznica. Next the club relegated from the competition, Jovanović signed with Dinamo Vranje in summer as a single player. After a season with Dinamo, Jovanović made a deal with the Serbian SuperLiga club OFK Bačka in 2017.

Career statistics

References

External links
 
 
 

1992 births
Living people
Sportspeople from Pristina
Serbian footballers
Association football fullbacks
FK Javor Ivanjica players
FK Rudar Kostolac players
FK Železničar Lajkovac players
FK Inđija players
FK Loznica players
FK Dinamo Vranje players
OFK Bačka players
Serbian League players
Serbian First League players